John Edward "Stan" Enfield (31 August 1873 – 1 October 1935) was an Australian rules footballer who played with Geelong in the Victorian Football League (VFL).

Notes

External links 

1873 births
1935 deaths
Australian rules footballers from Victoria (Australia)
Geelong Football Club players